St Osyth's Abbey (originally and still commonly known as St Osyth's Priory) was a house of Augustinian canons in the parish of St Osyth (then named Chich) in Essex, England in use from the 12th to 16th centuries.  Founded by Richard de Belmeis, Bishop of London, it became one of the largest religious houses in Essex. It was dedicated to Saints Peter and Paul as well as St Osyth (Osith), a royal saint and virgin martyr.  Bishop Richard obtained the arm bone of St Osyth from Aylesbury for the monastic church and granted the canons the parish church of St Osyth.

The foundation began as a priory, probably populated first by canons from Holy Trinity, Aldgate.  The first prior of St Osyth's was William de Corbeil, who was elected archbishop of Canterbury in 1123 and who crowned King Stephen in 1135. The priory was converted into an abbey in the mid-12th century.

In Gesta pontificum Anglorum, William of Malmesbury spoke in praise of the piety and learning of the canons at St Osyth's in the twelfth century. One of the second generation of canons there was William de Vere, later bishop of Hereford, who wrote a Latin Life of St Osyth, in which he mentions that his mother Adeliza, daughter of Gilbert fitz Richard of Clare, had been a corrodian at the abbey for twenty years of her widowhood.

A charter of King Henry II confirmed the right of the canons of St Osyth's to elect their abbot and to hold a market every Sunday at Chich in the later 12th century.

John Depyng, prior of St. Botolph's was made abbot of St Osyth's in 1434, and took with him goods of considerable value belonging to the priory. He never returned these, and after his death St Botolph's brought an apparently unsuccessful lawsuit in Chancery against St Osyth's for their recovery.

During the Suppression of the Monasteries, the religious group was dissolved by King Henry VIII in 1539, at which time there were a prior and sixteen canons.  The king granted it to his minister Thomas Cromwell, but on his fall from favour, the abbey and its estates were returned to crown possession.  In the reign of King Edward VI they were sold to Sir Thomas Darcy for just under £400.  The gatehouse, dating from the late 15th century, is the most significant remnant of the original monastic structures still standing. The exterior is a fine example of decorative flint work. It stood in for St Anselm's theological college in the BBC's miniseries adaptation of P. D. James' Death in Holy Orders in 2003.

Five parts of the priory are Grade I listed buildings.

Burials
Richard de Belmeis I
Adeliza de Clare de Vere, mother of Aubrey de Vere, 1st Earl of Oxford
Lucy Young Rochford, wife of William Nassau de Zuylestein, 4th Earl of Rochford

References

External links
Picturesque England
B/W Drawing of the gateway:  (from the magazine Once A Week)

Monasteries in Essex
1120s establishments in England
Christian monasteries established in the 12th century
1539 disestablishments in England
Augustinian monasteries in England
Grade I listed churches in Essex
Grade I listed monasteries
Grade II listed parks and gardens in Essex
St Osyth